8. Jagd Division (8th Fighter Division) was one of the primary divisions of the German Luftwaffe in World War II. It was formed 15 June 1944 in Wien-Kobenzel from the Jagdfliegerführer Ostmark and subordinated to the I. Jagdkorps. The Division was subordinated to the IX. (J) Fliegerkorps in April 1945 and transferred to  Wolfsleithen and put under the command of Luftwaffenkommando 4.

Commanding officers
Oberst Gotthard Handrick, 15 June 1943 – May 1945

Notes

References
 8. Jagd-Division @ Lexikon der Wehrmacht
 8. Jagddivision @ The Luftwaffe, 1933-45

Air divisions of the Wehrmacht Luftwaffe
Military units and formations established in 1943
Military units and formations disestablished in 1945